Terri Te Tau is a New Zealand contemporary artist and writer. She is a member of the Mata Aho Collective. In 2017, the collective represented New Zealand at documenta, a quinquennial contemporary-art exhibition held in Kassel, Germany. This was the first time New Zealand artists had been invited to present their work at the event.

Te Tau, who is of Rangitāne and Ngāti Kahungunu descent, was raised in the Wairarapa region She received her tertiary education at Massey University, where she is a lecturer at the Whiti o Rehua School of Art.

Funding from the Earle CreativityTrust led to an exhibition held at Te Manawa, a museum in Palmerston North, in October 2015.

References

External links

 

Living people
New Zealand contemporary artists
Year of birth missing (living people)

Massey University alumni
Academic staff of the Massey University